Paolo Viganò (born 12 April 1969) is a former Italian paralympic cyclist who won a gold medal at the Summer Paralympics.

References

External links
 

1969 births
Living people
Paralympic cyclists of Italy
Paralympic gold medalists for Italy
Medalists at the 2008 Summer Paralympics
Paralympic medalists in cycling
Cyclists at the 2008 Summer Paralympics
Cyclists at the 2012 Summer Paralympics